Ciné-Bulles is a quarterly French-language film magazine published in Montreal, Quebec, Canada by the Association des cinémas parallèles du Québec, an association of Quebec independent theatre operators.

History and profile
Ciné-Bulles has been published since 1982. The magazine was started as a bimonthly magazine. It is devoted in large part to Quebec cinema.

See also
Séquences
24 images

References

1982 establishments in Quebec
Cinema of Quebec
Film magazines published in Canada
French-language magazines published in Canada
Magazines established in 1982
Magazines published in Montreal
Quarterly magazines published in Canada
Bi-monthly magazines published in Canada